Vladimír Tkáč (born 9 January 1998) is a professional Slovak footballer who last played for ViOn Zlaté Moravce as a forward.

Club career

FC ViOn Zlaté Moravce
Tkáč made his Fortuna Liga debut for ViOn Zlaté Moravce against AS Trenčín on 23 February 2019.

References

External links
 FC ViOn Zlaté Moravce official club profile 
 
 Futbalnet profile 
 

1998 births
Living people
People from Partizánske
Sportspeople from the Trenčín Region
Slovak footballers
Slovak expatriate footballers
Association football forwards
FC Nitra players
3. Liga (Slovakia) players
4. Liga (Slovakia) players
FC ViOn Zlaté Moravce players
Slovak Super Liga players